The Banu Alfageer was one of the Jewish tribes of Arabia during Muhammad's era.

They were included in point 31 of the Constitution of Medina as allies to the Muslims, being as "one nation", but retaining their Jewish religion.

References

Jewish tribes of Arabia